Phosphorus-32 (32P) is a radioactive isotope of phosphorus. The nucleus of phosphorus-32 contains 15 protons and 17 neutrons, one more neutron than the most common isotope of phosphorus, phosphorus-31. Phosphorus-32 only exists in small quantities on Earth as it has a short half-life of 14 days and so decays rapidly.

Phosphorus is found in many organic molecules and so phosphorus-32 has many applications in medicine, biochemistry, and molecular biology where it can be used to trace phosphorylated molecules (for example, in elucidating metabolic pathways) and radioactively label DNA.

Decay
Phosphorus-32 has a short half-life of 14.268 days and decays into sulfur-32 by beta decay as shown in this nuclear equation:
{| border="0"
|- style="height:2em;"
| ||→ || ||+ || ||+ ||
|}
1.709 MeV of energy is released from this decay. The kinetic energy of the electron varies with an average of approximately 0.5 MeV and the remainder of the energy is carried by the nearly undetectable electron antineutrino. In comparison to other beta radiation-emitting nuclides the electron is moderately energetic. It is blocked by around 1 m of air or 5 mm of acrylic glass.

The sulfur-32 nucleus produced is in the ground state so there is no additional gamma ray emission.

Production

Phosphorus-32 has important uses in medicine, biochemistry and molecular biology. It only exists naturally on earth in very small amounts and its short half-life means useful quantities have to be produced synthetically. Phosphorus-32 can be generated synthetically by irradiation of sulfur-32 with moderately fast neutrons as shown in this nuclear equation:

The sulfur-32 nucleus captures the neutron and emits a proton, reducing the atomic number by one while maintaining the mass number of 32.

This reaction has also been used to determine the yield of nuclear weapons.

Uses
Phosphorus is abundant in biological systems and, as a radioactive isotope is almost chemically identical with stable isotopes of the same element, phosphorus-32 can be used to label biological molecules. The beta radiation emitted by the phosphorus-32 is sufficiently penetrating to be detected outside the organism or tissue which is being analysed

Nuclear medicine
Many radioisotopes are used as tracers in nuclear medicine, including iodine-131, phosphorus-32, and technetium-99m. Phosphorus-32 is of particular use in the identification of malignant tumours because cancerous cells have a tendency to accumulate more phosphate than normal cells. The location of the phosphorus-32 can be traced from outside the body to identify the location of potentially malignant tumors.

The radiation emitted by phosphorus-32 can be used for therapeutic as well as diagnostic purposes. The use of 32P-chromic phosphate has been explored as a possible chemotherapy agent to treat disseminated ovarian cancer. In this situation, it is the long-term toxic effects of beta radiation from phosphorus-32 accumulating in the cancerous cells which has the therapeutic effect. Phosphorus-32 is widely used for cancer detection and treatment, especially in eyes and skin cancer.

Biochemistry and molecular biology
The metabolic pathways of organisms extensively use phosphorus in the generation of different biomolecules within the cell. Phosphorus-32 finds use for analysing metabolic pathways in pulse chase experiments where a culture of cells is treated for a short time with a phosphorus-32-containing substrate. The sequence of chemical changes which happen to the substrate can then be traced by detecting which molecules contain the phosphorus-32 at multiple time points following the initial treatment.

DNA contains a large quantity of phosphorus in the phosphodiester linkages between bases in the oligonucleotide chain. DNA can therefore be tracked by replacing the phosphorus with phosphorus-32. This technique is extensively used in Southern blot analysis of DNA samples. In this case, a phosphorus-32-containing DNA probe hybridises to its complementary sequence where it appears in a gel. Its location can then be detected by photographic film.

Plant sciences
Phosphorus-32 is used in plant sciences for tracking a plant's uptake of fertiliser from the roots to the leaves.  The phosphorus-32-labelled fertiliser is given to the plant hydroponically or via water in the soil and the usage of the phosphorus can be mapped from the emitted beta radiation. The information gathered by mapping the fertiliser uptake show how the plant takes up and uses the phosphorus from fertiliser.

Safety
The high energy of emitted beta particles and the low half-life of phosphorus-32 make it potentially harmful; Its molar activity is 338.61 TBq/mmol (9151.6 Ci/mmol) and its specific activity is 10.590 EBq/kg (286.22 kCi/g). Typical safety precautions when working with phosphorus-32 include wearing a personal dosimeter to monitor exposure and an acrylic or perspex radiation shield to protect the body. Dense shielding, such as lead, is less effective due to the high-energy bremsstrahlung produced by the interaction of the beta particle and the shielding. Because the beta radiation from phosphorus-32 is blocked by around 1 m of air it is also advisable to wear dosimeters on the parts of the body, for example the fingers, which come into close contact with the phosphorus-32-containing sample.

References

External links
   β- DECAY, β+ DECAY, ELECTRON CAPTURE, & ISOMERIC TRANSITION

Isotopes of phosphorus
Medical isotopes